Plains is a town in Sumter County, Georgia, United States. The population was 776 at the 2010 census. It is part of the Americus Micropolitan Statistical Area. Plains is best known as the birthplace and home of Jimmy Carter, the 39th president of the United States.

History
Originally inhabited by the Muscogee people, by the 1840s three small settlements existed nearby: Plains of Dura, Magnolia Springs, and Lebanon. As railway access expanded into the region in response to increased cotton farming, these settlements coalesced closer to the new railway location. As businesses rapidly developed, local businessmen successfully petitioned the State Legislature to shorten Plains of Dura to Plains. Plains was subsequently incorporated in 1896. Plains continued to experience growth fueled by cotton cultivation well into the early twentieth century. A substantial school and the pioneering Wise Sanitarium were both built in the 1920s. Despite differentiation into peanut cultivation, the Great Depression deprived the community of much of its prosperity. Plains remained a quiet Southern town until Jimmy Carter rose to political prominence as Governor of Georgia in the 1970s, eventually becoming President of the United States from 1977 to 1981.

During the 1976 presidential election and for many years afterwards, Plains saw a giant influx in tourism. Nearly ten thousand people would pour into the community daily.

Geography
The city's boundary is in the shape of a circle. Plains has a center longitude/latitude point which is -83.0813/33.4553. Plains is located in west-south-western Georgia, 120 miles due south of Atlanta.

Points of interest
Many of the town’s attractions are related to the Jimmy Carter National Historical Park. Carter’s high school, birthplace, campaign headquarters, former site of family business, and his brother Billy’s service station are all within a close vicinity of one another in the center of town. The iconic Smiling Peanut Statue, a gift to Carter from supporters in Evansville, Indiana, lies on the outskirts of town. His boyhood home is in nearby Archery.

Andersonville National Historic Site and the National Prisoner of War Museum are located in the vicinity of Plains. Georgia Southwestern State University is located in the nearby town of Americus. Westville, a re-created town depicting the living history of mid-nineteenth century Georgia, is located in the nearby town of Lumpkin in adjacent Stewart County.

Climate
This area climate is characterized by hot, humid summers and generally mild to cool winters.  According to the Köppen Climate Classification system, Plains has a humid subtropical climate, abbreviated "Cfa" on climate maps.

Demographics

As of the census of 2000, there were 637 people, 215 households, and 136 families residing in the city. The racial makeup of the city was 38.62% White, 59.81% African American, 1.26% from other races, and 0.31% from two or more races. Hispanic or Latino of any race were 2.83% of the population. There were 215 households, out of which 25.6% had children under the age of 18 living with them, 36.7% were married couples living together, 24.2% had a female householder with no husband present, and 36.3% were non-families. 34.9% of all households were made up of individuals, and 19.5% had someone living alone who was 65 years of age or older. The average household size was 2.50 and the average family size was 3.31.

In the city, the population was spread out, with 24.6% under the age of 18, 8.5% from 18 to 24, 16.5% from 25 to 44, 20.3% from 45 to 64, and 30.1% who were 65 years of age or older. The median age was 45 years. For every 100 females, there were 69.0 males. For every 100 females age 18 and over, there were 58.9 males.

The median income for a household in the city was $26,719, and the median income for a family was $29,375. Males had a median income of $24,375 versus $16,406 for females. The per capita income for the city was $11,602. About 22.2% of families and 25.6% of the population were below the poverty line, including 47.2% of those under age 18 and 17.3% of those age 65 or over.

Notable people

Former President Jimmy Carter was born in Plains at the Wise Sanitarium (now renamed the Lillian G. Carter Nursing Center, in honor of his mother). His wife Rosalynn, their daughter Amy, his younger brother Billy, his younger sister, Gloria Carter Spann, his youngest sister, Ruth Carter Stapleton, and first cousin Hugh Carter were also born in Plains. The former president and his wife returned to Plains when he left office, and continue to live there.

Gallery

References

External links
 
 Official Page of the City of Plains, Georgia Portal style website, Government, Business, Library, Recreation and more
 City-Data.com Comprehensive Statistical Data and more about Plains

Cities in Georgia (U.S. state)
Cities in Sumter County, Georgia
Americus, Georgia micropolitan area